The 2010 Croatian Cup Final was a two-legged affair played between Hajduk Split and Šibenik. 
The first leg was played in Split on 21 April 2010, with the second leg on 5 May 2010 in Šibenik.

Hajduk Split won the trophy with an aggregate result of 4–1.

Road to the final

First leg

Second leg

References

External links
Official website 

2010 Final
HNK Hajduk Split matches
Cup Final